The Richmond Quakers were a professional minor league baseball team, based in Richmond, Indiana. The club was first formed in 1908 as team in the class-D Indiana-Ohio League. However a long series of financial losses by every club in the league, caused its disbandment. The Richmond Amusement Company, which owned the Quakers, reported loses in excess of a thousand dollars. However the team was willing to continue the team in the league if the other clubs would stay, on the chance of regaining its losses later.

The Quakers continued to play independently, although several of their star players received offers from other teams. Star player, Paddy Baumann, and several other key players reportedly received offers from the Terre Haute Hottentots of the Central League. A second incarnation of Richmond Quakers entered minor league play for one season in 1917, as a member of the Central League, before permanently folding.

Year-by-year record

References

1908 establishments in Indiana
Defunct baseball teams in Indiana
Baseball teams established in 1908
Baseball teams disestablished in 1917
1917 disestablishments in Indiana
Central League teams